Rukirabasaija Omukama Oyo Nyimba Kabamba Iguru Rukidi IV, King Oyo, is the reigning Omukama of Tooro, in Uganda. He was born on 16 April 1992 to King Patrick David Mathew Kaboyo Olimi III and Queen Best Kemigisa Kaboyo. Three and half years later in 1995, Oyo ascended the throne and succeeded his father  to become the 12th ruler of the 180-year-old Kingdom of Tooro.

Background
In pre-colonial times, what is now Uganda was composed of sovereign kingdoms and societies headed by chiefs and kings, whereas most societies in Uganda such as communities in its north and northeastern were loosely set up systems led by clan leaders, others like Bunyoro, Buganda, Ankole and Tooro were organised kingdoms.

In 1966, the political powers of the traditional leaders were abolished by the nationalist movement led by Milton Obote, who opposed the kings because of their collaboration with British colonial authorities alongside their potential to be divisive forces and thus a threat to the nascent republic. The 1970s and 1980s were characterised by political instability and civil unrest, which led to serious repercussions for the cultural institutions. Many of the leaders like the Kabaka Mutesa of Buganda and Omukama Patrick Kaboyo of Toro were forced into exile to escape the regime of terror. It was not until 1986 that President Yoweri Museveni, by an amendment to the constitution in 1993, reinstated the kingdoms. The kingdoms would never enjoy the sovereignty they had in pre-colonial times, but they would be instrumental in mobilising the country towards social and economic recovery.

Kingdom
Tooro, with its capital at Mucwa in Fort Portal City, lies in the mid-western part of present-day Uganda. The people of Tooro, known as the Batooro or Batoro, comprise at least 3.5 percent of the 47.5 million people of Uganda (2022 estimate). The Kingdom is ruled by the Babiito dynasty, whose history dates as far back as the 14th century. According to oral history, Prince Olimi Kaboyo Kasunsunkwanzi, son of Rukirabasaija King of Bunyoro, annexed the southern part of his father's Kingdom in 1822 and founded what is known as Tooro today.

Title
Oyo Nyimba Kabamba Iguru is referred to as the Omukama, which means "King", and Rukirabasaija, which means "the greatest of men". Although he is considered the sovereign leader of the Batooro, Oyo Nyimba Kabamba Iguru's power is limited to cultural duties. His full Title and name is Rukirabasaija Omukama Oyo Nyimba Kabamba-Iguru Rukidi IV.

Coronation
The death of his father King Kaboyo in 1995 meant the crown prince had to assume the role of king during his toddler years. At 2 a.m. on 12 September 1995, a week after the late king's burial, the rituals to hand over the reins of power to Oyo Nyimba Kabamba Iguru began. He became the youngest modern monarch at just 3 years old. They included a mock battle at the palace entrance fought between enemy forces of a "rebel" prince and the royal army, and a test of Oyo's divine right to the throne, in which the Omusuuga, (head of the royal clan), called on the gods to strike Oyo dead if he was not of royal blood. On passing the test, Oyo was permitted to sound the Nyalebe, a sacred Chwezi drum, as his forefathers had done. He was then blessed with the blood of a slaughtered bull and a white hen.

At 4 a.m, Oyo Nyimba Kabamba Iguru was crowned King amidst a jubilant crowd and entered the Karuziika palace ha Kyaro Nyamunyaka as the new ruler of the Kingdom of Tooro. He was served his first meal as King, which consisted of millet dough. He sat in the lap of a virgin girl, and he swore allegiance to the Crown while lying on his side on the ground.

The cultural rituals (Emirwa y'Obuhangwa) were followed by a religious ceremony presided over by the Anglican Bishop, Eustance Kamanyire of Fort Portal based Ruwenzori Diocese. President Museveni attended the coronation celebrations and paid tribute to the new King.

King Oyo Nyimba celebrates 27 years on the throne on Monday 12 Sep 2022 held at Kurizika Palace in Fort Portal, the coronation was attended by Prime Minister Steven Kiyingi and several royalties lead by Prince Charles Kamurasi the Uncle to Oyo Omukama, The prayers were led by Religious leaders from Catholic and the Anglican Church (Bishop Kisembo Reuben), during the coronation the queen re-echoed that the king should find a suitable wife or helper who is fit for him as a King during the Coronation Kisembo Reuben congratulated Steven Kiyingi the newly appointed Toro Kingdom Prime Minister and called out calm and peace among all people of Toro Kingdom and in his philosophy he believes in dialogue and principle of negotiation for solutions to disagreements. The religious leaders appreciated Oyo Nyimba for the Constructive technology he brought to the Kingdom.

Regency
Three regents were charged with overseeing King Oyo's growth into the role of King and with handling the cultural affairs of the Kingdom during the King's childhood and youth. At the time of his coronation, the three regents included his mother, Queen Best (the Queen Mother); his aunt/godmother, Princess Elizabeth Bagaaya; his uncle Prince Jimmy Mugenyi and President Museveni.

The late Colonel Muamar Gaddafi, the leader of Libya, was a patron of the Kingdom of Toro with close ties to the royal family. The 9 year old King Oyo named Gaddafi the "defender" of the Kingdom and invited him to attend the 6th coronation anniversary celebrations in 2001. Gaddafi had made donations to the Kingdom, helping pay for refurbishments to the Palace in Fort Portal.

Charity and development projects
One of the main duties of the King is to lobby for donations for economic and social welfare projects for the wellbeing of his subjects. These include health, education, economic and cultural projects. The latter is important to build the people's confidence in the King and promote strong cultural identity. Supported by his regents and family, Oyo travels the world seeking foreign assistance for the development of Toro. Most recently, Oyo received 100 wheelchairs on behalf of the Kingdom which were distributed to five regions of Toro. Other humanitarian projects are endorsed by the Kingdom through the Batebe Foundation of Toro which runs a special education fund for needy children.

Oyo started a project of constructing an ICT center youth center and a model farm.

Education
Aside from his official duties, King Oyo goes to school and has time to play with his friends. However, his status dictates that he goes to private school and has a personal security guard at all times. Oyo spent two years in London and attended preschool there. On return to Uganda he got elementary level of education at The Aga Khan Primary school in Kampala. He later on went to Kampala International School Uganda for high school and says he enjoyed art, music, math, and swimming. He later on enrolled for a Degree in Business Management from Winchester University in the United Kingdom. In October 2013, three years later, King Oyo graduated from the University of Winchester with a bachelor's degree.

Awards 
 Recipient of 2019 Global Top 100 Most Influential People of African Descent (MIPAD - New York) - Politics & Governance (Class of 2019)

References

External links

 Tooro Kingdom Official Website* Photo of King Oyo Nyimba Rukidi IV at Age 18 (2010)
 Karimi, Faith. African teen king lives dual life – CNN – 16 March 2010
 "Ugandan child king honours Gaddafi." BBC. 16 July 2001.
 Outreach to Africa – The Wheelchair Story Uganda 2004
 The New Vision (Uganda), 3 March 2006

Toro
Toro people
1992 births
Living people
Ugandan monarchies